Reginald William Weaver (14 September 1905 – 16 July 1970) was an English professional footballer who played as an outside right.

Career
Born in Radstock, Weaver spent his early career with Llanhilleth United, Newport County, Wolverhampton Wanderers and Chelsea. At Chelsea he scored 8 goals in 20 league appearances between 1929 and 1932. He signed for Bradford City from Chelsea in June 1932, and scored 3 goals in 8 league appearances for the club, scoring 1 goal, before moving to Chesterfield in March 1933. At Chesterfield he scored 2 goals in 11 games in the 1933–34 season before returning to Newport County. He later played for Bath City and Gloucester City. He died in Gloucester on 16 July 1970.

Sources

References

1905 births
1970 deaths
English footballers
Newport County A.F.C. players
Wolverhampton Wanderers F.C. players
Chelsea F.C. players
Bradford City A.F.C. players
Chesterfield F.C. players
Bath City F.C. players
Gloucester City A.F.C. players
English Football League players
Association football outside forwards
People from Radstock